The Leiden Conventions or Leiden system is an established set of rules, symbols, and brackets used to indicate the condition of an epigraphic or papyrological text in a modern edition. In previous centuries of classical scholarship, scholars who published texts from inscriptions, papyri, or manuscripts used divergent conventions to indicate the condition of the text and editorial corrections or restorations. The Leiden meeting was designed to help to redress this confusion.

The earliest form of the conventions was agreed at a meeting of classical scholars at the University of Leiden in 1931 and published the following year.  There are minor variations in the use of the conventions between epigraphy and papyrology (and even between Greek and Latin epigraphy). More recently, scholars have published improvements and adjustments to the system.

Most important sigla

See also
 +++ (modem) (for use of sequence in telecommunication possibly inspired by Leiden Conventions)
 Corpus Inscriptionum Latinarum
 Ellipsis
 EpiDoc
 Lacuna (manuscripts)
 Primary source
 Supplementum Epigraphicum Graecum

Citations

General and cited references 
 Marcus Dohnicht, "Zusammenstellung der diakritischen Zeichen zur Wiedergabe der lateinischen Inschrifttexte der Antike für den Unicode" (Entwurft Juli 2000).
 Sterling Dow, "Conventions in editing: a suggested reformulation of the Leiden System", Greek, Roman and Byzantine Studies Scholarly Aids 2, Durham, 1969.
 Tom Elliott et al. (2000–2008), "All Transcription Guidelines" in EpiDoc Guidelines.
 Traianos Gagos (1996), "Conventions", in A Select Bibliography of Papyrology.
 J. J. E. Hondius, "Praefatio", Suplementum Epigraphicum Graecum 7 (1934), p. i.
 A. S. Hunt, "A note on the transliteration of papyri", Chronique d'Égypte 7 (1932), pp. 272–274.
 Hans Krummrey, Silvio Panciera, "Criteri di edizione e segni diacritici", Tituli 2 (1980), pp. 205–215.
 Silvio Panciera, "Struttura dei supplementi e segni diacritici dieci anni dopo" in SupIt 8 (1991), pp. 9–21.
 Louis Robert, Jeanne Robert, "La Carie : histoire et géographie historique", II, Paris, 1954, pp. 9–11 on "Signes critiques du corpus et édition".
 Onno van Nijf, "Critical Signs: Leiden system plus additions"
 Joshua D. Sosin et al. (2011), "Papyrological Conventions used in Duke Databank texts".
 B. A. van Groningen, "De signis criticis in edendo adhibendis", Mnemosyne 59 (1932), pp. 362–365.
 B. A. van Groningen, "Projet d'unification des systèmes de signes critiques", Chronique d'Égypte 7 (1932), pp. 262–269.
 Ulrich Wilcken, "Das Leydener Klammersystem", Archiv für Papyrusforschung 10 (1932), pp. 211–212.

 Leiden usage in corpora
 L'Année épigraphique, Presses Universitaires de France (Revue archéologique. Supplément 1888–1964; autonomous 1965–). (See front matter.)
 Corpus Inscriptionum Latinarum, Berlin: de Gruyter, 1853–. (Conventions at front.)
 Oxyrhynchus Papyri, Egypt Exploration Society, 1898–. (See preface.)
 Supplementum Epigraphicum Graecum, Lugduni Batavorum: Sijthoff, 1923–. (See front matter.)

External links 
 Leiden+

Ancient Greece
Ancient Roman studies
Inscriptions
Classical philology